The 2002–03 Central Michigan Chippewas men's basketball team represented Central Michigan University as a member of the Mid-American Conference during the 2002–03 NCAA Division I men's basketball season. The team was led by head coach Jay Smith and played their home games at the Daniel P. Rose Center. After finishing atop the MAC regular season standings, the Chippewas won the MAC tournament to earn an automatic bid to the NCAA tournament as No. 11 seed in the West region. Central Michigan defeated No. 6 seed Creighton in the opening round before losing to No. 3 seed Duke in the Round of 32. The team finished with a record of 25–7 (14–4 MAC).

Roster

Schedule and results

|-
!colspan=9 style=| Regular season

|-
!colspan=9 style=| MAC Tournament

|-
!colspan=9 style=| NCAA Tournament

Awards and honors
Chris Kaman – MAC Player of the Year, AP Honorable Mention All-American
Jay Smith – MAC Coach of the Year

2003 NBA draft

References

Central Michigan
Central Michigan Chippewas men's basketball seasons
Central Michigan
Central Michigan Chippewas men's basketball
Central Michigan Chippewas men's basketball